Kismet is a 1955 American musical-comedy film directed by Vincente Minnelli and produced by Arthur Freed. It was filmed in CinemaScope and Eastmancolor and released by Metro-Goldwyn-Mayer.

It is the fifth movie version of Kismet. The first was released in 1914, the second in 1920, the third in 1930 by Warner Brothers, and the fourth, starring Ronald Colman and Marlene Dietrich, by MGM in 1944. The 1955 film is based on the successful 1953 stage musical Kismet, while the four earlier versions are based on the original 1911 play by Edward Knoblock.

Plot
In old Baghdad, an impoverished poet (Howard Keel) is abducted and brought to the desert tent of Jawan (Jay C. Flippen), an elderly thief, having been mistaken for a man who cursed Jawan fifteen years ago. As a result of the curse, Jawan's beloved son was kidnapped, and Jawan longs to find him again before he dies. The Poet asks for one hundred gold pieces to reverse the curse; Jawan agrees and returns to Baghdad to look for his son.

In Baghdad, the Poet's daughter, Marsinah (Ann Blyth) meets and falls in love with the young Caliph (Vic Damone), who has been traveling incognito. They arrange to meet again that night.

The Poet is arrested when he begins spending his hundred gold pieces because his purse carries the insignia of a wealthy family that was robbed. At the Wazir's (Sebastian Cabot) court, he defends himself against the charge of robbery but also curses the Wazir. Jawan, brought before the Wazir on another charge, angrily confirms the Poet's story and then notices a familiar amulet around the Wazir's neck. In this way, Jawan discovers his long-lost son.

The Caliph announces that he plans to take a bride that night, discomforting the Wazir, who has a badly needed loan riding on persuading the Caliph to marry a princess of Ababu. The Wazir, fearing that the Poet's curse had something to do with it, offers to make the Poet an (Emir) if he reverses the curse. The Poet happily accepts, and when the Wazir leaves him alone with his favorite wife Lalume (Dolores Gray), the two realize they have similar temperaments.

The Poet orchestrates an elaborate "curse-reversal" scheme that enables him to sneak out of the palace; he finds Marsinah and convinces her that he will be killed unless they flee Baghdad. Despite Marsinah's protests—she wants to wait for her rendezvous and see the Caliph's wedding procession—they flee. Word spreads that the Caliph's bride was not there when the Caliph came to claim her. Since the "curse reversal" seems to have worked, the Poet leaves Marsinah and returns to the palace.

The Poet tells Lalume that he is worried about Marsinah, and Lalume suggests that she come to live in the palace. Marsinah arrives and confesses that she has fallen in love but does not know her beloved's name. Lalume hides Marsinah in the harem for her own protection, but there the Caliph sees her and believes her to be a wife of the Wazir. When the Wazir privately congratulates the Poet on bringing the Caliph's true love into the Wazir's own harem, the Poet realizes that the Caliph is Marsinah's beloved.

At a ceremony planned to choose a new bride, the Poet tricks the Wazir and (almost) drowns him in front of the Caliph and the crowd. The Poet is sentenced to death, but Lalume saves the day as Marsinah is revealed to be the Poet's daughter and the victim of the Wazir's scheming. The Caliph sentences the Wazir to death and the Poet to exile. The Poet agrees, but asks to take the soon-to-be-widowed Lalume with him. Thus the Poet weds Lalume and the Caliph weds Marsinah—all in the course of a single day.

Cast
 Howard Keel as The Poet
 Ann Blyth as Marsinah
 Dolores Gray as Lalume
 Vic Damone as The Caliph
 Monty Woolley as Omar
 Sebastian Cabot as The Wazir
 Jay C. Flippen as Jawan
 Mike Mazurki as The Chief Policeman
 Jack Elam as Hasan-Ben
 Ted de Corsia as Police Sub-altern
 Pat Sheehan as Harem Girl
 Barrie Chase as Harem Girl
 June Kirby as Harem Girl
 Suzanne Ames as Harem Girl

Songs 

 “Rhymes Have I”
 “Fate”
 "Not Since Nineveh"
 "Baubles, Bangles, and Beads"
 "Stranger in Paradise"
 "Gesticulate"
 "Bored"
 "Night of My Nights"
 "The Olive Tree"
 "And This Is My Beloved"
 “Rahadlakum”
 "Sands of Time"

Reception
According to MGM records the film earned $1,217,000 in the US and Canada and $610,000 elsewhere resulting in a loss of $2,252,000.

The film is recognized by American Film Institute in these lists:
 2004: AFI's 100 Years...100 Songs:
 "Stranger in Paradise" – Nominated
 2006: AFI's Greatest Movie Musicals – Nominated

See also
 List of American films of 1955

References

External links
 
 
 
 
 

1955 films
1955 musical comedy films
1950s musical fantasy films
1955 romantic comedy films
American musical comedy films
American romantic comedy films
American romantic musical films
Films based on musicals
Films directed by Vincente Minnelli
Films set in Baghdad
Metro-Goldwyn-Mayer films
American musical fantasy films
Films produced by Arthur Freed
Films based on adaptations
CinemaScope films
1950s English-language films
1950s American films